The Lancashire and Yorkshire Railway Class 25 is a class of 0-6-0 steam locomotive.  They were introduced to the Lancashire and Yorkshire Railway in 1876 by new locomotive superintendent William Barton Wright and 280 were built in total. Of these, 230 were later converted to saddle tanks by John Aspinall, to become L&YR Class 23.

Ownership changes
The locomotives passed briefly to the London and North Western Railway (LNWR) in 1922 and then to the London, Midland and Scottish Railway (LMS) in 1923. The LMS gave them the power classification 2F. 
In 1948, the surviving locomotives (23) passed to British Railways (BR), which numbered them 52016-52064 (with gaps).

Withdrawal
Withdrawals began in 1930 but 23 locomotives survived into British Railways ownership in 1948.

Preservation
The last engine, BR 52044 (L&YR 957, LMS 12044) was bought for preservation in 1959 and has been based at the Keighley and Worth Valley Railway since 1965. It starred in the film The Railway Children as the Green Dragon. It was out of service from 1975 but was returned to steam in 2001 in its BR guise as 52044 before being painted in its L&YR guise as 957 a few years later. Its  boiler certificate expired in early 2013. After a couple of years on display, overhaul started in July 2016.

A sister locomotive, L&YR Class 23 no. 752, rebuilt from Class 25 as a saddle tank by Aspinall after 1891, was also bought for preservation and was based at the Keighley and Worth Valley Railway alongside 957, until being moved to the East Lancashire Railway in Bury for complete overhaul.

References

25
0-6-0 locomotives
Railway locomotives introduced in 1876
Standard gauge steam locomotives of Great Britain

Freight locomotives